The Season: A Candid Look at Broadway is an account of the 1967–1968 season on and off-Broadway by American novelist and screenwriter William Goldman. It originally was published in 1969 and is considered one of the better books ever written on American theater. In The New York Times, Christopher Lehmann-Haupt called the book “Very nearly perfect...It is a loose-limbed, gossipy, insider, savvy, nuts-and-bolts report on the annual search for the winning numbers that is now big-time American commercial theatre.”

Goldman reports in the book that he spent over 18 months of reporting on the book, seeing every show on Broadway, many of them more than once, as well as preview productions in the principal try-out towns like Boston, New Haven, and Washington, D.C.

The book is presented roughly in chronological order throughout the season. It analyzes the Broadway audience and the economics of Broadway theatre at the time as well as the shows given during the season, and it profiles or interviews the significant theatrical personalities of the day.

Plays
The plays and musicals described include:
A Day in the Death of Joe Egg by Peter Nichols starring Albert Finney and Zena Walker directed by Michael Blakemore
A Minor Adjustment
After the Rain by John Griffith Bowen
Avanti! by Samuel Taylor
Before You Go
The Boys in the Band by Mart Crowley
Brief Lives, starring Roy Dotrice
By George starring Max Adrian about the letters of George Bernard Shaw
Carry Me Back to Morningside Heights by Robert Alan Aurthur, directed by Sidney Poitier
Daphne in Cottage D, starring Sandy Dennis and William Daniels
Darling of the Day, starring Vincent Price
Dr. Cook's Garden by Ira Levin, starring Burl Ives and Keir Dullea, originally directed by George C. Scott
Eddie Fisher and Buddy Hackett at the Palace
Everything in the Garden by Edward Albee
George M! starring Joel Grey, directed by Joe Layton
Golden Rainbow, starring Eydie Gormé and Steve Lawrence
Hair
Halfway Up the Tree by Peter Ustinov
Happiness Is Just a Little Thing Called a Rolls Royce
Henry, Sweet Henry by Bob Merrill and Nunnally Johnson with Don Ameche, directed by George Roy Hill
Here's Where I Belong by Terrence McNally and others
How Now, Dow Jones, directed by George Abbott, music by Elmer Bernstein
How to Be a Jewish Mother
I Never Sang for My Father by Robert Anderson with Lillian Gish
I'm Solomon
Johnny No-Trump by Mary Mercier
Judy Garland "At Home at the Palace"  with Judy Garland
Keep It In the Family by Bill Naughton
Leda Had a Little Swan with Michael J. Pollard
Leonard Sillman's New Faces of 1968, produced by Leonard Sillman
Loot by Joe Orton
Mata Hari, directed by Vincente Minnelli, produced by David Merrick
Mike Downstairs
More Stately Mansions by Eugene O'Neill, starring Ingrid Bergman and Colleen Dewhurst, directed by Jose Quintero
Plaza Suite by Neil Simon, starring George C. Scott and Maureen Stapleton, directed by Mike Nichols
Portrait of a Queen
Rosencrantz and Guildenstern Are Dead by Tom Stoppard
Soldiers by Rolf Hochhuth, starring John Colicos
Something Different, written and directed by Carl Reiner, starring Bob Dishy
Song of the Grasshopper by Alfonso Paso, starring Alfred Drake
Spofford by Herman Shumlin, starring Melvyn Douglas
Staircase by Charles Dyer, starring Eli Wallach and Milo O'Shea
The Birthday Party by Harold Pinter
The Education of H*Y*M*A*N K*A*P*L*A*N, directed by George Abbott with Tom Bosley
The Exercise by Lewis John Carlino with Anne Jackson
The Freaking Out of Stephanie Blake, starring Jean Arthur
The Grand Music Hall of Israel
The Guide by Harvey Breit and Patricia Rinehart
The Happy Time by Kander and Ebb, directed by Gower Champion with Robert Goulet
The Little Foxes by Lillian Hellman, directed by Mike Nichols with George C. Scott and Anne Bancroft
The Ninety Day Mistress with Dyan Cannon
The Only Game in Town by Frank Gilroy with Barry Nelson and Tammy Grimes
The Price by Arthur Miller, directed by Ulu Grosbard
The Prime of Miss Jean Brodie, starring Zoe Caldwell
The Promise starring Ian McKellen, Ian McShane and Eileen Atkins
Scuba Duba by Bruce Jay Friedman
The Seven Descents of Myrtle by Tennessee Williams, directed by José Quintero
The Trial of Lee Harvey Oswald, starring Peter Masterson
The Unknown Soldier and His Wife by Peter Ustinov, directed by John Dexter with Christopher Walken
There's a Girl in My Soup by Terence Frisby starring Gig Young
Weekend by Gore Vidal
What Did We Do Wrong? by Henry Denker with Paul Ford
There are also chapters on the actor Peter Masterson, critics (especially Clive Barnes), ticketing, corruption, women's "theatre party" groups, Jewish theatergoers, and homosexuality in the theatre.

Background
William Goldman decided to write the book after making a large amount of money on the sale of his script for Butch Cassidy and the Sundance Kid in the late 1960s. He wanted to attempt a non-fiction work and originally intended to do a piece on mental institutions, such as Meninger's, but was worried about what would happen if the institutions did not co-operate. He then decided to do an article on Broadway because he knew there always would be someone who would talk to him. Goldman:
For the original article, I wanted to interview everybody who was involved with a show in an important position, before and after. But I realized very early on that all failures have the same song. It's always a case of people not communicating, people not understanding, people lying. It's always the same wail, and I realized that my premise was not valid. But by this time, I was into it. It became obsessive, and it evolved into whatever The Season is. The Season I enjoyed writing. I don't like writing very much. But doing The Season was social.

Reception
The book received mixed reviews, The Chicago Tribune calling it "entertaining" and the Wall Street Journal "uneven". Walter Kerr, who was criticized in the book, called it "a good book; crabby, opinionated, honest in its jaundice, loving in its bitterness, well-researched, exasperated, swift and itchy". However, he later disagreed with Goldman's contention that all critics' darlings were women.

Harold Clurman, who also featured in the book, said it performed "a hatchet job on Broadway... though I agree with a good number of Goldman's statements... I do not find this book, in any serious or truly helpful sense, illuminating." He also complained about Goldman's treatment of critics. Christopher Lehmann Haupt of the New York Times called the book a "loose-limbed, insidey, savvy, nuts and bolts report" but complained about Goldman's suggestions to improve theatre and his criticisms of critics.

Goldman later said that he:
Was determined to write as honest a book as I could. It was a year and a half of my life and a lot of people still won't speak to me because of that book and it really shocked me. I was so shocked by people's responses I stopped going to the theatre. For about five years I didn't go at all. I had hoped that somebody would say 'Well, at least it's down now. This is what Broadway is like at this point in time.' And it was, for the most part, atrociously reviewed...and so many people hated it and hated me for writing it...I mean there were actresses who would say 'If I ever see him, I would hit him.' Things like that. There was a wild reaction to it.

Notes

References
 The Season: A Candid Look at Broadway (Limelight) by William Goldman 

1969 non-fiction books
English-language books
Non-fiction books about theatre